Lorraine Feather (born Billie Jane Lee Lorraine Feather; September 10, 1948) is an American singer, lyricist, and songwriter.

Early life
A native of Manhattan, she was born to jazz writer Leonard Feather and his wife Jane, a former big band singer. She was named Billie Jane Lee Lorraine for her godmother Billie Holiday, her mother's former roommate Peggy Lee, and for the song "Sweet Lorraine".
Three of her albums have been nominated for Grammy Awards in the Best Jazz Vocal Album category: Ages (2010), Attachments (2013), and Flirting with Disaster (2015).

Discography
 Joanne Grauer Introducing Lorraine Feather (MPS, 1978)
 Sweet Lorraine (Concord Jazz, 1978)
 The Body Remembers (Bean Bag, 1996)
 New York City Drag (Rhombus, 2000)
 Such Sweet Thunder (Sanctuary, 2003)
 Cafe Society (Sanctuary, 2003)
 Dooji Wooji (Sanctuary, 2005)
 Language (Jazzed Media, 2008)
 Ages (Jazzed Media, 2010)
 Tales of the Unusual (Jazzed Media, 2012)
 Attachments (Jazzed Media, 2013)
 Flirting with Disaster (Jazzed Media, 2015)
 Math Camp (Relarion, 2018)

References

External links
 Official site
 Ages review (Michael G. Nastos), AllMusic
 Tales of the Unusual review (Ken Dryden), AllMusic
 Dooji Wooji review (Christopher Loudon), JazzTimes 2005
 Language feature (Susan Stamberg), NPR 2008
 Live review, Lorraine Feather/Shelly Berg (Stephen Holden), The New York Times 2008
 Flirting with Disaster review (Brenda Hillegas), Elmore magazine 2015
 Math Camp review (Christopher Loudon), JazzTimes 2018

Living people
1948 births
People from Manhattan
Jazz musicians from New York (state)
Singer-songwriters from New York (state)
American women jazz singers
American women singer-songwriters
American jazz singers
American people of English-Jewish descent
American pop musicians
Jewish American musicians
Jewish American songwriters
Jewish women singers
21st-century American Jews
21st-century American women
Sanctuary Records artists
Concord Records artists